Togocetus (“Togo whale”) is a genus of extinct cetacean from the Lutetian (lower Eocene) of Togo, known from a fossilized skeleton discovered a few kilometers north-east of Lomé.

Discovery and description
The skeleton was found in a phosphate mining area, Kpogamé-Hahotoé, which is located just north of Lake Togo. It was embedded in a phospharenite bone bed dating back to 46 – 44 million years ago, and overlying an older rock unit, the Tabligbo Group. The remains were described in 2014 by Philip D. Gingerich and Henri Cappetta, who established for it the new monotypic genus Togocetus and the new species T. traversei, dedicated to Michel Traverse.

According to the two authors, Togocetus was a semiaquatic animal which must have weighed
It was a protocetid with rather primitive traits such as a still quite long neck, a digitigrade manus and a swim-specialized pes. It shared many similarities with the protocetid genera Protocetus and Pappocetus, the main differences being a smaller mandibular canal, the loss of the fovea capitis femoris (hence of the ligament of head of femur) and some traits related to the molar trigonids. Later analysis of ear structure evidence originally attributed to Togocetus raised some question regarding established understanding of protocetid evolution. The original analysis revealed a contradiction in assumed relationship between ear ossicle structure and mandibular canal size; later research and additional evidence revealed multiple places where more modern, specialized traits were blended unexpectedly with archaic ones, causing some controversy. Despite the fragmentary nature of the fossil record and the subtleties differentiating protocetids, T. traversei has consistently been shown to have unique features defining it, including a completely novel entoglenoid shape and several fossae otherwise not seen in contemporary cetaceans.

References

Bibliography

M

Protocetidae
Eocene mammals of Africa
Prehistoric monotypic mammal genera
Prehistoric cetacean genera
Fossil taxa described in 2014
Paleontology in Togo